Roberto Leal may refer to:

 Roberto Leal Lobo e Silva Filho (born 1938), Brazilian professor
 Roberto Leal Monteiro (born 1946), Home Affairs Minister of Angola
 Roberto Leal (singer) (1951–2019), Portuguese singer
 Roberto Leal (TV presenter) (born 1979), Spanish TV presenter